Jorge Humberto Rodríguez-Novelo (born March 22, 1955) is a Mexican-born American prelate of the Roman Catholic Church, serving as an auxiliary bishop for the Archdiocese of Denver since 2016.Rodriguez-Novelo has held teaching positions at Catholic universities and institutions in the United States, Italy and Spain.

Biography

Early life 
Jorge Rodriguez-Novelo was born on March 22, 1955, in Mérida, Mexico. He is the son of Nery Maria Novelo and Ramon Rodriguez, and has one brother and four sisters.  Rodriguez-Novelo attended a Maryknoll Sisters primary school and then a Marist Brothers high school, both in Mérida.  After finishing high school, he went to the Centre of Classical Humanities in Salamanca, Spain to study Latin and Greek languages. After returning to Mexico, Rodriguez-Novelo performed missionary work in Chetumal in the Yucatan.  He then entered the novitiate period for the Legion of Christ religious order.  On April 2, 1982, took his solemn vows in the Legion of Christ. 

Rodriguez-Novelo entered the Pontifical Gregorian University in Rome, where in 1984 he received a Licentiate in Philosophy.  After starting his bachelor degree studies at the Angelicum University in Rome, he became an academic assistant of philosophical studies at the Centre of Higher Studies of the Legion of Christ. In 1987, Rodriguez-Novelo was awarded a Bachelor of Theology degree from the Pontifical University of St. Thomas Aquinas and a Diploma in Mariological Studies from the Pontifical University Marianum  He was ordained as a deacon by Cardinal Justin Rigali in Rome that same year.

Priesthood 
Rodriguez-Novelo was ordained a priest in Rome for the Legion of Christ by Cardinal Jean Hamer on December 24, 1987.

After his ordination, Rodriguez-Novelo stayed in Rome to work at the Legion of Christ Centre and other academic institutions. He was also assigned as a pastoral associate at Our Lady of Guadalupe Parish in Rome.  He was appointed prefect of theological studies at the Legion Centre in 1989.  In 1990, he received his Licentiate in Sacred Theology from the Gregorian University and was named a professor.  Rodriguez-Novelo was awarded a doctorate in theology in 1994 from the Gregorian University.  That same year, he was appointed  general prefect of studies at the Legion Centre  During this same period, Rodriguez-Novelo was a professor and dean of the Department of Theology at the Pontifical Athenaeum Regina Apostolarum in Rome.  He also lectured for one year in theology at Francisco de Vitoria University in Madrid, Spain.

In 1999, Rodriguez-Novelo moved to Colorado to assume positions in the Archdiocese of Denver.  He was first assigned as associate pastor of St. Therese Parish in Aurora, Colorado.  In 2000, he was also named associate director of vocations for Hispanic discernment for the archdiocese. In 2001, Rodriguez-Novelo left  St. Therese to become vice president of the Our Lady of the New Advent Theological Institute and vice prefect of studies at the new St. John Vianney Theological Seminary, both in Denver.

Rodriguez-Novelo returned to Rome in 2002 to serve as associate pastor of Stella Mans Parish in Ostia, Rome.  During this stay, he also served as a professor and associate director of the Spirituality Year.  He was incardinated, or transferred, in 2004 to the Archdiocese of Rome.  In 2006, Rodriguez-Novelo moved back to Denver to become pastoral assistant at Saint Michael the Archangel Parish in Aurora and Holy Family Parish in Denver, along with vice rector of St. Vianney Seminary.  He was incardinated into the Archdiocese of Denver in 2008. In 2010, Rodriguez-Novelo was named as an ex-officio member of the Presbyteral Council and became parochial vicar for Ascension Parish in Denver.  He assumed the role of pastor in 2012 at Holy Cross Parish in Thornton, Colorado and professor in 2014 at St. John Vianney Seminary.

Auxiliary Bishop of Denver
Pope Francis appointed Rodríguez-Novelo as an auxiliary bishop for the Archdiocese of Denver on August 25, 2016. On November 4, 2016, he was consecrated by Archbishop Samuel Aquila at the Cathedral Basilica of the Immaculate Conception in Denver

See also

 Catholic Church hierarchy
 Catholic Church in the United States
 Historical list of the Catholic bishops of the United States
 List of Catholic bishops of the United States
 Lists of patriarchs, archbishops, and bishops

References

External links

 Roman Catholic Archdiocese of Denver Official Site

Episcopal succession

 

1955 births
Living people
Legionaries of Christ
People from Mérida, Yucatán
21st-century Roman Catholic bishops in the United States
Bishops appointed by Pope Francis